Mesosa kanarensis is a species of beetles in the family Cerambycidae. It was described by Stephan von Breuning in 1948. It is known from India.

References

kanarensis
Beetles described in 1948